Beggar's Bush is a hamlet in the  community of Pencraig, Powys, Wales, which is 55 miles (88 km) from Cardiff and 137 miles (220 km) from London. A round barrow is situated nearby, known as "Beggar’s Bush Barrow". The first recording of the name was in (1698)

References

See also
List of localities in Wales by population

Villages in Powys